The Purigpa are a community found in Kargil district, Ladakh, India. Out of 39,000 Purigpas, 38,000 are Muslim. The remaining few are mostly Buddhists. In 2011, there were 992 Buddhists among the Purigpas.

Social status
, the Purigpa were classified as a Scheduled Tribe under the Indian government's reservation program of positive discrimination. As of 2011 Population Census of India, Purigpa population stood at 39,101 with 20,119 males and 18,982 females. The adult sex ratio stood at 943 and child sex ratio at 971. They boasted a  literacy rate of 67.5 per cent, which was better than the average tribal literacy rate of 50.6 per cent in the erstwhile state of Jammu and Kashmir.

History and culture 
The Purigpa have varied origins and are descendants of Tibetans and Dards. These two groups began intermingling from the 10th century onward.

The Purigpas are primarily Shia Muslims of the Twelver sect. They were converted by preachers who arrived via Baltistan beginning in the 15th and 16th centuries.

See also
 Kargil district
 Purgi language

References

Scheduled Tribes of India
Ethnic groups in India
Muslim communities of India